Ctirad Jungmann (born 20 May 1959) is a Czech rower. He competed in the men's eight event at the 1980 Summer Olympics.

References

1959 births
Living people
Czech male rowers
Olympic rowers of Czechoslovakia
Rowers at the 1980 Summer Olympics
Rowers from Prague